Sir John Kevin Curtice  (born 10 December 1953) is a British political scientist who is currently professor of politics at the University of Strathclyde and senior research fellow at the National Centre for Social Research. He is particularly interested in electoral behaviour and researching political and social attitudes. He took a keen interest in the debate about Scottish independence.

Early life
Curtice was born on 10 December 1953. He grew up in St Austell and was educated at Truro School and Magdalen College, Oxford, where he read politics, philosophy and economics, and later transferred to Nuffield College as a postgraduate.

Commitments and positions
He serves as president of the British Polling Council, vice-chair of the Economic and Social Data Service's Advisory Committee and is a member of the editorial board of the Journal of Elections, the Executive Committee of the British Politics Section of the American Political Science Association, and the Policy Advisory Committee of the Institute for Public Policy Research. He was formerly a Fellow at the Netherlands Institute for Advanced Study and a member of the steering committee of the Comparative Study of Electoral Systems Project.

Curtice has frequently appeared on the BBC during broadcast coverage of general elections in the United Kingdom, giving his accurate predictions of the results in 2005, 2010, 2015 and 2017. He has picked up a strong following on social media, and was mentioned frequently on Twitter during the 2017 election, though he shuns this attention, adding "I've no wish to become a media celebrity".

Awards and honours
Curtice was elected Fellow of the Royal Society of Arts in 1992 and a Fellow of the Royal Society of Edinburgh in 2004. In 2014 he was elected a Fellow of the British Academy, the United Kingdom's national academy for the humanities and social sciences. Curtice was appointed a Knight Bachelor in the 2018 New Year Honours for services to the Social Sciences and Politics.

Personal life
Curtice is married to a medical sociologist with one daughter.

Books
 British Social Attitudes: the 24th report (ed. with A. Park, K. Thomson, M. Phillips, M. Johnson and E. Clery), London: Sage, 2008
 British Social Attitudes: the 25th report (ed. with A. Park, K. Thomson, M. Phillips, and E. Clery), London: Sage, 2009
 Has Devolution Worked? (ed. with B. Seyd), Manchester: Manchester University Press, 2009
 Revolution or Evolution?: The 2007 Scottish Elections, (with D. McCrone, N. McEwen, M. Marsh and R.Ormston), Edinburgh: Edinburgh University Press, 2009
 British Social Attitudes: the 26th report (ed. with A. Park, K. Thomson, M Phillips, and E. Clery), London: Sage, 2010.
 British Social Attitudes: the 27th report (ed. with A. Park, E. Clery and C. Bryson), London: Sage,  2010

References

External links
 Centre for Research into Elections and Social Trends (CREST)

1953 births
Living people
People educated at Truro School
Alumni of Magdalen College, Oxford
British political scientists
Psephologists
Fellows of the Royal Society of Edinburgh
Fellows of the British Academy
Alumni of Nuffield College, Oxford
Knights Bachelor